Shaye Sharahili (born 30 May 1990) is a Saudi Arabian football plays as a defensive midfielder.

Honours

Clubs
Al-Nassr
Saudi Professional League: 2013–14, 2014–15
Crown Prince Cup: 2013–14

Al-Faisaly
King Cup: 2020–21

References

Living people
Saudi Arabian footballers
Saudi Arabia international footballers
Al Nassr FC players
Al-Qadsiah FC players
Al-Faisaly FC players
1990 births
Sportspeople from Riyadh
Saudi Professional League players
Association football midfielders